Osyris quadripartita, commonly known as wild tea plant, is a hemiparasitic plant found in Mediterranean habitats. It is a dioecious plant, with separate male and female flowers.

References

Flora of Nepal
quadripartita
Dioecious plants